Madonna and Child with Four Cherubs is a c.1440 terracotta sculpture by Donatello, now in the Bode-Museum in Berlin, which bought it in 1888. Still partly medieval in its iconography, Mary and Jesus' heads touch in a manner also seen in the artist's Pazzi Madonna. The work was badly damaged in the 1945 fire, with breaks in several places and losing its traces of polychromy.

References

Sculptures by Donatello
Terracotta sculptures
Sculptures of the Berlin State Museums
Statues of the Madonna and Child
1440 sculptures